Antonio Romano (born 21 January 1995) is an Italian professional footballer who plays as a forward for Italian Serie B club Cesena.

Career
Born in Acerra, Campania, Romano started his career at Lombard club F.C. Internazionale Milano. He was a player of under-12 team in Lombard Esordienti League in 2006–07 season, to under-17 team in National Allievi League in 2011–12 season. At Inter Milan Romano also received call-up from national youth teams, without any debut. On 13 August 2012 Romano left for the reserve team of Pro Vercelli, initially in temporary deal. Romano also wore no.21 shirt for the first team. He only played once for the Serie B team, on 18 May 2013, the last round of 2012–13 Serie B, as a substitute of Pietro Iemmello in the opening of the first half. Romano was substituted by Cristian Bunino in the second half of the match. Pro Vercelli was relegated to Lega Pro Prima Divisione after that match, however also signed Romano outright from Inter.

On 31 January 2014 Romano was signed by Serie B club Brescia Calcio. On 27 June 2014, few days before the closure of 2013–14 financial year, Romano (for €2.4 million) and Felice Di Cecco (for €1.6 million) were sold to Serie A newcomer Cesena, with Emanuele Fonte (for €2.4 million) and Simone Galassi (for €1.6 million) moved to Brescia. Romano signed a three-year contract. Romano failed to play any game for the Romagna-based team. The team also relegated back to Serie B in May 2015.

In summer 2015 Romano trained with Romagnol team Santarcangelo. However, on 31 August he returned to Cesena. The club also signed Di Cecco and Abdoul Yabré from Cesena on the same day, as well as Romano's namesake from Napoli on 4 August.

References

External links
 AIC profile (data by football.it) 

Italian footballers
Inter Milan players
F.C. Pro Vercelli 1892 players
Brescia Calcio players
A.C. Cesena players
Serie B players
Association football forwards
People from Acerra
Footballers from Campania
1995 births
Living people